The 1938 Maryland Terrapins football team represented the University of Maryland in the 1938 college football season. In their third season under head coach Frank Dobson, the Terrapins compiled a 2–7 record (1–2 in conference), finished in 12th place in the Southern Conference, and were outscored by their opponents 235 to 86.

Schedule

References

Maryland
Maryland Terrapins football seasons
Maryland Terrapins football